Tullig is a townland and small village located in the Loop Head peninsula in County Clare, Ireland.

It was described in the 1845 Parliamentary Gazetteer as: 

The village was virtually destroyed during the Great Famine.

References

Towns and villages in County Clare